The Ballad of Josie is a 1967 Technicolor American comedy Western film directed by Andrew V. McLaglen and starring Doris Day, Peter Graves, and George Kennedy. It humorously tackles 1960s themes of feminism in a traditional Western setting.

The film featured the last acting role for William Talman. It was filmed on two locations in Thousand Oaks, California: North Ranch and Wildwood Regional Park.

Plot
Josie (Doris Day) is a young woman living in (fictional) Arapahoe County, Wyoming. She accidentally kills her abusive alcoholic husband when she opens the bedroom door and knocks him backward down the stairs. She is put on trial for his death, but is acquitted. Her father-in-law gets custody of her young son (since he was better able to provide for his care) and takes him to Cheyenne to live while she tries to build a life as a rancher (including wearing Levi's pants, boots, etc.). Josie then incurs the annoyance of her male cattle rancher neighbors by farming sheep north of the Wyoming deadline), and setting up a women's suffrage movement.

Cast
 Doris Day as Josie Minick
 Peter Graves as Jason Meredith
 George Kennedy as Arch Ogden
 Andy Devine as Judge Tatum
 William Talman as District Attorney Charlie Lord
 David Hartman as Sheriff Fonse Pruitt
 Guy Raymond as Doc
 Audrey Christie as Annabelle Pettijohn
 Karen Jensen as Deborah Wilkes
 Elisabeth Fraser as Widow Renfrew
 Linda Meiklejohn as Jenny McCardle
 Pat Carroll as Elizabeth
 Timothy Scott as Klugg The Sheepherder
 Don Stroud as Bratsch The Sheepherder
 Paul Fix as Alpheus Minick
 Harry Carey as Mooney, Meredith's Foreman
 John Fiedler as Simpson, general store owner
 Robert Lowery as Whit Minick, town drunk
 Teddy Quinn as Luther Minick, Josie's son
 Edward Faulkner as Juror/Liveryman

See also
List of American films of 1967

References

External links
 
 
 

1967 films
1960s Western (genre) comedy films
American Western (genre) comedy films
1960s English-language films
1960s feminist films
Films scored by Frank De Vol
Films directed by Andrew McLaglen
Films set in Wyoming
Universal Pictures films
American feminist films
1967 comedy films
1960s American films